Follese is a village on the island of Askøy in Vestland, Norway. As of 2017, Follese had 2539 inhabitants including the area of Hetlevik to the north.

Economy 
Follese has a furniture, food, and plastics industry. There is also a small port for leisure boats.

Norwegian ice cream company, Isbjørn Is, is headquartered in Follese.

References 

Askøy
Villages in Vestland